The 2225 N Street Apartment Building in the West End neighborhood of Northwest Washington, D.C., was constructed in 1924 by local real estate developers Harry Wardman and Eugene Waggaman. The building was added to the District of Columbia Inventory of Historic Sites in 1990 and the National Register of Historic Places in 1994.

See also
 National Register of Historic Places in Washington, D.C.

References

External links
 

District of Columbia Inventory of Historic Sites

Apartment buildings in Washington, D.C.
Residential buildings completed in 1924
Residential buildings on the National Register of Historic Places in Washington, D.C.